Prehistoricisms is the second studio album by American progressive metal band Intronaut. It was released on September 16, 2008 by Century Media Records, to positive reviews.  It is the first album to feature guitarist Dave Timnick, as the band moves towards a jazzier, more progressive sound.

Track listing

Personnel
 Sacha Dunable − guitar, vocals
 Dave Timnick − guitar
 Joe Lester − bass
 Danny Walker − drums, samples

References

Intronaut albums
2008 albums
Century Media Records albums